The Curtius Museum (Musée Curtius) is a museum of archaeology and decorative arts, located on the bank of the river Meuse in Liège, Belgium, classified as a Major Heritage of Wallonia.

It was built sometime between 1597 and 1610 as a private mansion for Jean Curtius, industrialist and munitions supplier to the Spanish army. With its alternating layers of red brick and natural stone, and its cross-mullioned windows, the building typifies the regional style known as Mosan Renaissance architecture.

After a 50 million euro redevelopment, the museum reopened as the Grand Curtius (Le Grand Curtius) in March 2009, now housing the merged collections of four former museums: the museum of archeology, the museum of weaponry, the museum of decorative arts, and the museum of religious art and Mosan art. Highlights in the collections include treasures of Mosan art such as a twelfth-century gilded reliquary triptych, formerly in the church of Sainte-Croix, the Evangelarium of Notger, sculptures by Jean Del Cour, and a  portrait of Napoleon Bonaparte painted by Ingres in 1804: Bonaparte, First Consul.

External links
   Official website of the Grand Curtius Museum

References 

Wallonia's Major Heritage
Decorative arts museums in Belgium
Archaeological museums in Belgium
Art museums and galleries in Belgium
Museums in Liège (city)
Tourist attractions in Liège